Impact is a science fiction thriller novel by American writer Douglas Preston, published on January 5, 2010 by Forge Books. The novel is the third book in the Wyman Ford series. The book was reviewed on All Things Considered in February 2010.

Plot summary
Ex-CIA agent Wyman Ford returns to Cambodia to investigate the source of radioactive gemstones and uncovers an unusual impact crater. A young woman on the other side of the world photographs a meteoroid's passage in the atmosphere with her telescope and deduces that it must have struck on one of the islands just offshore from Round Pond, Maine. A NASA scientist analyzing data from the Mars Mapping Orbiter (MMO) spots unusual spikes in gamma ray activity. These threads intersect with discovery of an alien device that has apparently been on Deimos, one of the two moons of Mars, for at least 100 million years. Something has caused it to activate and fire a strangelet at Earth, setting off the events in the novel.

Timeline
The events in this novel follow those of The Codex, Tyrannosaur Canyon, and Blasphemy. As such, Wyman Ford is the protagonist once again (having appeared in Tyrannosaur Canyon and Blasphemy), and the character of Stanton Lockwood III (who debuted in Blasphemy) also returns.

See also
Exotic matter
Dark matter
Quark star

References

External links
Book profile on the publisher's website

American thriller novels
Techno-thriller novels
Novels by Douglas Preston
2010 American novels
2010 science fiction novels
Novels set on Mars
Novels set in Cambodia
Novels set in Maine
Forge Books books